Cirque Peak is a  mountain summit located in the Cayoosh Range of the Lillooet Ranges, in southwestern British Columbia, Canada. The mountain's cirque name, which describes the shape of the peak, was submitted by mountaineer Karl Ricker of the Alpine Club of Canada. The name was officially adopted on January 23, 1979, by the Geographical Names Board of Canada. Precipitation runoff from the peak drains into tributaries of the Fraser River.

Climate

Based on the Köppen climate classification, Cirque Peak is located in a subarctic climate zone of western North America. Most weather fronts originate in the Pacific Ocean, and travel east toward the Coast Mountains where they are forced upward by the range (Orographic lift), causing them to drop their moisture in the form of rain or snowfall. As a result, the Coast Mountains experience high precipitation, especially during the winter months in the form of snowfall. Temperatures can drop below −20 °C with wind chill factors below −30 °C. The months July through September offer the most favorable weather for climbing Cirque Peak.

Climbing Routes

Established climbing routes on Cirque Peak:

 East Face Gully   
 North Ridge via Place Glacier -

See also

 Geography of British Columbia
 Geology of British Columbia

References

External links
 Weather forecast: Cirque Peak

Two-thousanders of British Columbia
Lillooet Ranges